Patrice Jeener is a leading French artist and copper engraver,
specialising in work of a mathematical nature.

He studied at the Lycée Janson de Sailly and then (1963) at the l’Ecole Nationale Supérieure des Beaux-Arts.
Already influenced by the engravings of Maurits Escher and Flake's treatise on curvilinear perspective, he has exhibited at the Palais de la Decouverte and the Institute Henri Poincaré.
This included models of mathematical functions made out of plaster that he decided to use as inspiration.

He lives and works at La Motte Chalancon, a village between Vercors and Baronnies in Provence.

Examples of his work include the following
 « Topologie des surfaces » (Surface Topology)
 « Géométrie à 4 dimensions » (4-dimensional geometry)
 « Bouteille de Klein » (Klein bottle)

References

Living people
Year of birth missing (living people)